This Won't Hurt a Bit is a 1993 Australian comedy film. It was directed by Chris Kennedy.

According to Ozmovies,

Those searching for the source of inspiration for writer/director and co-producer Chris Kennedy need look no further than his professional life as a dentist, which saw him do time in England practising his skills. It’s perhaps pushing things to say that he dreamed up the idea of revenge on the English while peering into the mouths of his English patients, but his screenplay is filled with knowing nods in this direction.

Cast
Greig Pickhaver as Gordon Fairweather
Jacqueline McKenzie as Vanessa Prescott
Maggie King as Mrs. Prescott
Patrick Blackwell as Mr. Prescott
Dennis Miller as Riley
Adam Stone as Farow
Gordon Chater as Dental Professor
Alwyn Kurts as Psychiatrist
Colleen Clifford as Lady Smith

Release
The film opened at the Dendy Cinema in Sydney on 14 October 1993 for a short run, and from 11 November 1993 it had a short run at the Carlton Moviehouse in Melbourne.

References

External links

Website for the film
This Won't Hurt A Bit! at Ozmovies

Australian comedy films
Films about dentistry
Films scored by Mario Grigorov
1990s English-language films
1990s Australian films